San Basilio is a commune in the Province of South Sardinia, region of Sardinia, Italy, about  north of Cagliari.

San Basilio borders the municipalities of San Nicolò Gerrei, Sant'Andrea Frius, Senorbì, Silius, and Siurgus Donigala.

Demographic evolution

References

See also

 Sardinia Radio Telescope

Cities and towns in Sardinia